The Human Digital Orchestra is a contemporary series of collaborations as part of the Experiments in Art and Technology that connects Bell Labs scientists and engineers with the artistic community by blending digital communications technology with artistic expression.  The first performance of the Human Digital Orchestra was at the first Claude Shannon Centennial Conference on the Future of the Information Age on April 28, 2016. 

The Human Digital Orchestra performed for the second time at the Propeller Fest conference in Hoboken, New Jersey, on May 20, 2016, in a collaboration with Beatie Wolfe.

References

External links
Human Digital Orchestra, Nokia Bell Labs.
Collection of documents published by E.A.T, Daniel Langlois Foundation.
Screening of documentary on Robert Rauschenberg's 1966 E.A.T. performance piece "Open Score" at the National Academy of Sciences in Washington, D.C.
 Experiments in Art and Technology Los Angeles records, 1969-1975. Getty Research Institute, Research Library.
 Experiments in Art and Technology records, 1966-1997, bulk 1966-1973. Getty Research Institute, Research Library.
 The Godfather of Technology and Art: An Interview with Billy Klüver by Garnet Hertz, 1995.

Contemporary art organizations